Greatest Hits ... And More is a 2006 compilation and video albums of songs by English pop group 10cc as well as pre-10cc and post-10cc work by its founding members, Graham Gouldman, Eric Stewart and Kevin Godley and Lol Creme, performing as Godley & Creme.

Content
The band's first six albums, from 10cc (1973) through to Deceptive Bends (1977) are very well represented with four tracks each except for How Dare You! which has only three tracks featured. Only one song from Bloody Tourists (1978) features, however, and no material from any of the band's further five albums is featured, except for Mirror Mirror (1995), which is represented with "Ready to Go Home".

Three Godley & Creme songs are featured, two of these from Ismism (1981) and another from The History Mix Volume 1 (1985). The only album from an early incarnation of 10cc, Hotlegs' album Thinks: School Stinks (1971), is represented with the hit "Neanderthal Man". The biggest hit by Wax (Graham Gouldman and Andrew Gold) is also featured.

Finally, Graham Gouldman recordings of songs he had written for popular 1960s bands are featured on disc two, amongst them are songs he had written for The Hollies and The Yardbirds. "A Groovy Kind of Love" by The Mindbenders, a mid 1960s band featuring Eric Stewart, is also featured as the song was a hit in both the UK and the US. Two songs from GG/06 (Godley and Gouldman) also featured, these songs never having a release before.

The track "Feel the Benefit" included on the second CD was disrupted running at a slow speed making it a minute longer than the original

Release
The album was released as a double CD. The accompanying simultaneous video album is a re-release of the 1988 video Changing Faces – The Very Best of 10cc and Godley & Creme.

Reception
The album attracted criticism both from fans regarding the disruption of "Feel the Benefit" and from Eric Stewart, who noted his post-10cc work had been overlooked, while a disproportionate number of tracks representing Gouldman's career before and after 10cc had been included and indicated that Harvey Lisberg, the former 10cc manager and long-time Gouldman manager, had had a significant role in the album's track selection.

Track listing
Disc One:

 "Donna" (from 10cc, 1973)
 "Rubber Bullets" (from 10cc, 1973)
 "The Dean and I" (from 10cc, 1973)
 "The Wall Street Shuffle" (from Sheet Music, 1974)
 "Silly Love" (from Sheet Music, 1974)
 "Life Is a Minestrone" (from The Original Soundtrack, 1975)
 "I'm Not in Love" (from The Original Soundtrack, 1975)
 "Art for Art's Sake" (from How Dare You!, 1976)
 "I'm Mandy Fly Me" (from How Dare You!, 1976)
 "The Things We Do for Love" (from Deceptive Bends, 1977)
 "Good Morning Judge" (from Deceptive Bends, 1977)
 "Dreadlock Holiday" (from Bloody Tourists, 1978)
 "Ready to Go Home" (from Mirror Mirror, 1995)
 "Cry" – Godley & Creme (from The History Mix Volume 1, 1985)
 "Neanderthal Man" – Hotlegs (from Thinks: School Stinks, 1971)
 "Bridge to Your Heart" – Wax (from American English, 1987)

Disc Two:

 "Johnny Don't Do It" (from 10cc, 1973)
 "Old Wild Men" (from Sheet Music, 1974)
 "Worst Band in the World" (from Sheet Music, 1974)
 "People in Love" (from Deceptive Bends, 1977)
 "Feel the Benefit" (from Deceptive Bends, 1977)
 "Don't Hang Up" (from How Dare You!, 1976)
 "Second Sitting for the Last Supper" (from The Original Soundtrack, 1975)
 "Une Nuit A Paris" (from The Original Soundtrack, 1975)
 "Under Your Thumb" – Godley & Creme (from Ismism, 1981)
 "Wedding Bells" – Godley & Creme (from Ismism, 1981)
 "A Groovy Kind of Love" – The Mindbenders (from A Groovy Kind of Love, 1966)
 "No Milk Today" – Graham Gouldman (from The Graham Gouldman Thing, 1968)
 "Bus Stop" – Graham Gouldman (from The Graham Gouldman Thing, 1968)
 "For Your Love" – Graham Gouldman (from The Graham Gouldman Thing, 1968)
 "Heart Full of Soul" – Graham Gouldman (from And Another Thing..., 2000)
 "Beautifulloser.com" – GG06 (previously unreleased, 2006)
 "Son of Man" – GG06 (previously unreleased, 2006)

References

10cc albums
2006 greatest hits albums